The canton of Saint-Jean-de-Monts is an administrative division of the Vendée department in western France. Its borders were modified at the French canton reorganisation which came into effect in March 2015. Its seat is in Saint-Jean-de-Monts.

Composition

It consists of the following communes:
 
Barbâtre
La Barre-de-Monts
Beauvoir-sur-Mer
Bouin
L'Épine
La Guérinière
Noirmoutier-en-l'Île
Notre-Dame-de-Monts
Notre-Dame-de-Riez
Le Perrier
Saint-Gervais
Saint-Jean-de-Monts
Saint-Urbain
Soullans

Councillors

Pictures of the canton

References

Cantons of Vendée